Christopher Lee “Chris” Shivers (born December 30, 1978) is an American former professional rodeo cowboy who specialized in bull riding, and competed on the Professional Bull Riders (PBR) circuit. He turned pro in 1997, and won the PBR world championship in 2000 and 2003.

Background 
Chris Shivers was born on December 30, 1978, in Natchez, Mississippi.

Career
Shivers has twenty-two career Bud Light Cup Series (BLC) and Built Ford Tough Series (BFTS) wins. The BLC was the name of the PBR’s elite series from 1994 to 2002. The BFTS was the name from 2003 to 2017. 

Shivers has recorded the following history-making firsts: the first PBR bull rider to win more than $300,000 in prize money in one year (1998); the first PBR bull rider to reach the $1 million mark (2001), the $2 million mark (2003) and the $3 million mark (2006); the first PBR bull rider to register 13 90-point rides in one season (1998); the highest marked ride in PBR history (96.5 points - twice) [a record later broken by Jose Vitor Leme]; and the first bull rider to win three consecutive Bud Light Cup events (2000). 

Shivers is the second man to win multiple PBR world titles, after Adriano Moraes (1994, 2001). 

Shivers rode with a cowboy hat for most of his career. However, after a wreck fractured his nose at the 2009 BFTS season opening event in Baltimore, Maryland, he rode with a helmet for the remainder of his career. He had suffered multiple head and facial injuries throughout his career, but only made a helmet a permanent part of his riding gear after this specific injury.

Career highlights
First PBR bull rider to register 13 90-point rides in one season (1998)
First PBR bull rider to earn $1 million (2001), $2 million (2003) & $3 million (2006)
First PBR bull rider to earn $1 million World Champion bonus (2003)
94 career 90-point bull rides (most of any rider in PBR history)
Tied PBR Record High-Mark Ride (96.5 points) (2000 Tampa Open & 2001 PBR World Finals) [Record for Highest-Marked Ride in PBR history later broken by Jose Vitor Leme with 98.75 points in 2021]
15-time PBR World Finals qualifier (1997–2003, 2005–2012)
22 career Bud Light Cup/Built Ford Tough Series wins
4-time PBR Touring Pro Division/Challenger Tour Finals qualifier (1999–2001, 2004)
First bull rider in PBR history to win more than $300,000 in a single season (1998)
National High School Rodeo finals qualifier (1996)

Awards

2-time PBR World Champion (2000, 2003)
2012 Lane Frost/Brent Thurman Award (90.75 points on Shepherd Hills Sod Buster)
2001 Lane Frost/Brent Thurman Award (96.5 points on Dillinger)
2000 PBR 90-Point Club Champion 
2000 Copenhagen Touring Pro Division Champion 
1999 Lane Frost/Brent Thurman Award (96 points on Trick or Treat)
1997 Copenhagen Touring Pro Division Champion
1996 Louisiana State High School Bull Riding Champion

Championships
 2015 PBR Unfinished Business Decatur, Texas Co-Champion
 2012 PBR Atlanta, Georgia Invitational Champion
 2011 PBR Des Moines, Iowa Invitational Champion
 2009 PBR U.S. Army Invitational Worcester, Massachusetts Champion
 2008 PBR Tacoma, Washington Classic Champion
 2007 PBR Myron Duarte Maui, Hawaii Invitational Champion
 2006 PBR Phoenix, Arizona Open Champion
 2006 PBR Worcester, Massachusetts Classic Champion
 2006 PBR Charleston, South Carolina Classic  Champion
 2005 PBR Grand Rapids, Michigan Invitational  Champion
 2005 PBR Jerome Davis Challenge Greensboro, North Carolina Champion
 2005 PBR Southern Ford Dealers Invitational Tampa, Florida Champion
 2005 PBR Denver, Colorado Chute Out Champion
 2004 American Bucking Bull (ABBI) Bucking Bull Classic Las Vegas, Nevada Bull Riding Champion 
 2003 PBR Tampa, Florida Open Champion
 2003 PBR Jerome Davis Challenge Greensboro, NC Champion
 2003 PBR Mohegan Sun Invitational Uncasville, Connecticut Champion
 2002 PBR Alexandria, Louisiana U.S. Smokeless Tobacco Co. Challenger Tour Champion
 2001 PBR Jackson, Mississippi Touring Pro Champion
 2001 PBR NILE Invitational Billings, Montana Champion
 2001 PBR St. Louis, Missouri Open Champion
 2001 U.S. Smokeless Tobacco Co. Master Pro Finals Champion
 2000 PBR Portland, Oregon Open Champion
 2000 PBR Cleveland, Ohio Open Champion
 2000 PBR St. Louis, Missouri Open Champion
 2000 PBR Tampa, Florida Open Champion
 2000 PBR Springdale, Arkansas Copenhagen Tough Co. Champion
 2000 PBR Weatherford, Texas Copenhagen Tough Co. Champion
 2000 PBR Canadian Open Calgary, Alberta Champion
 1999 PBR San Antonio, Texas Touring Pro Champion
 1999 PBR Marshall, Texas Touring Pro Champion
 1998 PBR Hell on Hooves III Vancouver, British Columbia  Champion
 1998 PBR Lafayette, Louisiana Touring Pro Champion
 1998 PBR Justin Bull Riding Houston, Texas Champion
 1998 PBR Springdale, Arkansas Touring Pro Champion
 1998 PBR Marshall, Texas Touring Pro Champion

Honors
 2017 Bull Riding Hall of Fame
 2013 PBR Ring of Honor

Retirement
Shivers announced that the 2012 PBR season would be his last. He retired after the World Finals that year. His final earnings during his 16-year PBR career total nearly 3.3 million dollars. He was inducted into the PBR's Ring of Honor in 2013.

Unfinished Business
On May 30, 2015, Shivers came out of retirement for one more ride at "Unfinished Business" (a special event featuring several PBR legends coming out of retirement to attempt one final bull, held during the PBR's J.W. Hart Challenge at the Wise County Sheriff's Posse Arena in Decatur, Texas). There, he rode a bull named Black Cat for 88.5 points and split the event win with J.W. Hart (whose 88.5-point ride came aboard King Buck). Shivers and Hart were the only two PBR legends to ride their bulls for the full 8 seconds in the event.

Personal life
In 2001, Shivers married his girlfriend,  Kylie. They have three children. In 2019, Kylie was awarded the PBR Sharon Shoulders Award. The Shivers family resides in Jonesville in Catahoula Parish, Louisiana.

References

External links
Chris Shivers on PBR.com

1978 births
Living people
People from Jonesville, Louisiana
People from Natchez, Mississippi
Bull riders
Professional Bull Riders: Heroes and Legends